2016 Emmy Awards may refer to:

 68th Primetime Emmy Awards, the 2016 Emmy Awards ceremony that honored primetime programming during June 2015 – May 2016
 43rd Daytime Emmy Awards, the 2016 Emmy Awards ceremony that honored daytime programming during 2015
 44th International Emmy Awards, the 2016 ceremony that honored international programming

Emmy Award ceremonies by year